La Esperanza District may refer to:

La Esperanza District, Trujillo
La Esperanza District, Santa Cruz

District name disambiguation pages